Bahçe (or Bahçeköy) is a village in Silifke district of Mersin Province, Turkey. At  it is situated in the delta of Göksu River. The population of Bahçe is 229 as of 2011.

References

Villages in Silifke District